Kodal is a village and parish in Sandefjord municipality in Vestfold county, Norway. Kodal is mostly a rural area, with a population of 971 as of 2014. It is located ten kilometers north of Sandefjord city center and eleven miles south of the town center in Andebu. Kodal has one gas station, an elementary school, a kindergarten, grocery store, sports center, church, and two traffic schools. Several burial mounds dating back to the Viking Age have been found in the area. Kodal Church (Kodal kirke) is located in Prestbøen.

Agriculture is an important industry in Kodal, but large amounts of iron and phosphorus also occur. The amount of granite is estimated to be 100 million tons.

Etymology
Previous written forms of the name were Kvodal (from 1376), Kuadal (1390), Quadal (1414), and Quodal (1558). Its current spelling Kodal is kept from the 17th century. The first portion of the name, Ko-, may refer to the smaller river now known as Ivjua, which was formerly known as Kvaða/Kvæða. The name may also have derived from the word “Kóð”, which translates to “shallow waters.” It may have derived from the word “Kvaða”, which means resin and perhaps may have referred to Kodal's vast Spruce forests. The ending, -dal, most likely derives from “valley.”

Recreation
An ancient hill fort can be seen 5 km from the village centre in Kodal, connected by a hiking trail from the village centre. A closer parking lot can be found at Kodalveien 414. The trail is marked by blue paint on trees and rocks, and a variety of interpretive signs describing the fauna and flora can be found on the trail to Bygdeborgen.

Gallisvannet is the largest lake in Kodal and is located 44 meters above sea level.

References

Villages in Vestfold og Telemark
Andebu
Sandefjord